The Houston Automatic Spooling Priority Program, commonly known as HASP, is an extension of the IBM OS/360 operating system and its successors providing extended support for "job management, data management, task management, and remote job entry."

History

OS/360 included spooling routines, called reader/interpreters and output writers. Each reader/interpreter was "responsible for reading one input job stream" – that is one input device.  Likewise each output writer was responsible for controlling one printer or punch.  Spooled data were stored in OS temporary datasets controlled by standard OS services.  Each reader/interpreter or output writer was a separate operating system task in its own partition or region.  A system with a large number of readers, printers, and punches might have a large number of spooling tasks.

HASP was developed by IBM Federal Systems Division contractors at the Lyndon B. Johnson Space Center in Houston. The developers were Tom Simpson and Bob Crabtree. HASP was a program that ran on a mainframe, and performed  functions such as: scheduling, control of job flow, spooling and printing/punching. HASP had no support for IBM System/360 Operating System Remote Job Entry, 360S-RC-536, but provided roughly equivalent facilities of its own.

In HASP II V3, NIH created the shared spool capability for HASP that was used by many mainframe sites. It allowed each HASP system to share a common spool and checkpoint. This enabled workload balancing in a multi-mainframe environment. In HASP II V4,  Don Greb and Dave Miko of Mellon Bank moved shared spool to this version and carried it forward into JES2 multi-access spool (IBM's formal support of HASP in MVS). Over 350 copies of the HASP II V4 shared spool mods were distributed around the world. The shared spool Mellon Mods were added to the SHARE distribution process so they could be more widely accessed.

The program was sometimes referred to under various other names, but there is no indication of IBM ever using them in official documents.

The program became classified as part of the IBM Type-III Library. It had a competitor, ASP (Attached Support Processor), which ran on one mainframe and controlled scheduling of other attached mainframes. ASP later became JES3.

In MVS, HASP  became JES2, one of two Job Entry Subsystems. It was many years before the HASP labels were removed from the JES2 source, and the messages issued by JES2 are still prefixed with "$HASP".

A modified version of HASP was used to provide batch spooling and remote job entry services for the Michigan Terminal System during the late 1960s, 1970s, and 1980s.

Program organization
HASP bypassed most operating system services with code specially tailored for efficiency.  HASP operated as a single operating system task and used cooperative multitasking internally to run processors to perform tasks such as running card readers, printers, and punches, managing the spool files, communicating with the system operator, and driving multiple communication lines for remote job entry.

Hasp was written entirely in System/360 assembler and a typical HASP system might require 86KB of memory, which could be virtual memory on OS/VS systems.

pre-JES JECL
Much of what would become JES2's JECL was a part of HASP.
 /*MESSAGE   permitted sending a message to the console operator.
 /*SETUP     would notify the operator what was needed (tapes, disks, etc.)and in the meantime the job was in a HOLD queue.
 /*ROUTE PRINT & /*ROUTE PUNCH allowed flexibility, as needed.

Remote job entry
Hasp originally supported IBM Synchronous Transmit-Receive (STR) batch
terminals; however, HASP II dropped support for STR and only supported the
Binary Synchronous Communications (BSC) protocol.  HASP II supported
IBM terminals such as
2770,
2780,
3770,
3780,
but additionally provided support for multi-leaving communication with intelligent workstations such as the IBM 1130, IBM System/3 and the System/360 Model 20.  Multi-leaving is "fully synchronous, pseudo-simultaneous, bi-directional transmission of a variable number of data streams between two or more computers utilizing binary-synchronous communications facilities."

Third party vendors developed a variety of 2770/2780/3780 simulators and Multi-leaving implementations for use with HASP and ASP. Some of these vendors incorrectly referred to their products as HASP emulators, but the products were actually terminals that talked to HASP; they did not perform any of the functions of HASP.

Operator Commands
The RJE console operator could enter a restricted set of HASP Console Operator Commands. These HASP commands were the precursor of JES2's  Job Entry Control Language (JES2 JECL).

Operands were restricted to those from this remote site, hence DJ1-999 (below) would only display typically a few, those still outstanding from the operator's remote site.

Some of the HASP RJE Console commands, which could be entered in short (single letter) form, or spelled out, are:

A command line "C rm1.rdr" was meant to cancel rather than submit the current deck of cards being read. This might have been of use if a card jam made it more sensible to let other jobs go ahead while one or more cards were replaced at a nearby keypunch.

Job log
HASP job log output provided a summary of the resources used for the job (output appeared in all caps):

 Start time
 Stop time
 Execution time
 Memory usage
 Spool space used
 Cards read
 Cards punched
 Lines printed

See also 
 Remote Job Entry
 Job Entry Subsystem 2/3
 Peter G. Gyarmati
 Anthony James Barr

Notes

References 
 
 A History of Modern Computing, page 124, By Paul E. Ceruzzi, Published by MIT Press, 2003, . 445 pages
 
 
 

IBM mainframe operating systems
Job scheduling
Remote job entry
Assembly language software